Season 1879–80 was the fifth season in which Heart of Midlothian competed at a Scottish national level, entering the Scottish Cup for the fifth time.

Overview 
Hearts reached the third round of the Scottish Cup losing to Edinburgh derby rivals Hibs in the third rounds, in a match played at Mayfield Park, in the Mayfield area of Edinburgh. It was the third attempt at staging the match.

Results

Scottish Cup

Game had to be replayed due to power failure.

Edinburgh FA Cup

See also
List of Heart of Midlothian F.C. seasons

References 

 Statistical record 1879–80

External links 
 Official club website

Heart of Midlothian F.C. seasons
Hea